The Aotearoa Music Award for International Achievement is an Aotearoa Music Award that honours New Zealand music artists for their success in the music markets of other countries. Record sales are the main factor in determining the award, but record chart positions, sales of concert tickets and notable promotional performances are also taken into account. It was first awarded in 1984. It was not awarded in 2006. In 2005, 2008 and 2009, multiple artists received the honour.

Recipients

1984 to 2002

2003 to present 

From 2003, no finalists have been announced for the award.

References

International Achievement
Awards established in 1983